The 2018–19 Basketball Cup of Serbia is the 13th season of the Serbian 2nd-tier men's cup tournament.

The Cup Finalists, Novi Pazar and Sveti Đorđe, are qualified for the 2019 National Cup tournament held in Niš in February.

Bracket
Source: KUP KSS DRUGI STEPEN

Quarterfinals

Mladost SP v Vojvodina

Sveti Đorđe v Zdravlje

Kolubara LA 2003 v Novi Pazar

Zemun Fitofarmacija v Konstantin

Semifinals

Zemun Fitofarmacija v Novi Pazar

Sveti Đorđe v Vojvodina

Final

See also 
 2018–19 Radivoj Korać Cup
 2018–19 Basketball League of Serbia

References

External links 
 Basketball Competitions of Serbia

Basketball Cup of Serbia
Cup